Ann Elizabeth Carson, (born 19 March 1929) is a Canadian poet, author, artist, sculptor, feminist, and psychotherapist.

Biography 

Carson's love of words and writing began in elementary school. She published sporadically in high school, during her undergraduate
years at Trinity College, University of Toronto, and while raising four children.

Ann now writes, paints, and sculpts in Toronto and Manitoulin Island. She especially enjoys reading from her work at multi-media events with other poets, writers, and artists, and with dancers and musicians. Carson also leads workshops in how the arts create a new perspective in the ways we see ourselves and our world.

Carson belongs to the League of Canadian Poets, Old Town ARTbeat, the Ontario Poetry Society, the Toronto Heliconian Club, and the Tower Poetry Society. She is a Mother of 4 and grandmother of 6. She loves music, theatre, gardening, gallery hopping, and bookstore browsing with family and friends.

Publications 

 My Grandmother's Hair, a tale about how our family stories make our memories and shape our lives (Edgar Kent, 2007)
 Shadows Light, a collection of poetry and sculptures (Longboat Alliance, 2005)
 The Risks of Remembrance, new poems (Words Indeed, 2010)

Selections and reviews of Carson's books have appeared in publications, including the Sudbury Star (2005/10), Canadian Women Studies/les cahiers de la femme (2008/09, 2011), Herizons magazine (2008/9), p o e t r y'z o w n (2009/10, 2011), Celebrating Poets over 70, an anthology published by McMaster University Centre for Gerontological Studies and the Tower Poetry Society (2010), Island Mists, an anthology of the Poetry Institute (2010), Manitoulin Cross-pollination Two, exhibit catalogue of writers and artists (2010), Monhegan Memo No. 6 (2010), OWN Quarterly (December 2010) and Exile Quarterly (September 2010).

Awards 

Carson was selected as one of Toronto's Mille Femmes at the 2008 Luminato Festival, which paid tribute to women who have made a contribution to the arts.

References

External links 
 Author's Website

Living people
Writers from Toronto
21st-century Canadian poets
Canadian women poets
1929 births
21st-century Canadian women writers